The 2015 Salina Bombers season was the team's third and final season as a professional indoor football franchise and first as a member of Champions Indoor Football (CIF). One of nine teams in the CIF for the inaugural 2015 season, the Salina Bombers were owned by Chris Vercher. The Force played their home games at the Bicentennial Center in Salina, Kansas, under the direction of head coach Bob Ray. The season ended abruptly on May 28, 2015, after the CIF ejected the team from the league and the team subsequently folded entirely.

Season summary
The Bombers' announced schedule for the 2015 season was altered after the New Mexico Stars abruptly postponed their entry into the league on February 21, just one week before the season began. On March 3, the Albuquerque-based Duke City Gladiators were announced as a late entry into the league, partially replacing the Stars in the CIF schedule with a plan to play 11 games in 2015.

Salina started 2015 with a preseason win over cross-state rivals Kansas Koyotes and three straight regular season victories over CIF opponents. A mid-March loss to league-leading Sioux City Bandits was followed by a victory over the cellar-dwelling Omaha Beef. The Bombers then lost 3 straight, won 2 in a row, and lost in overtime on the road at the Wichita Force. This loss dropped them to 6–5 and put their playoff chances in doubt leading into their bye week.

The Bombers league membership was suspended by the CIF on May 28, with safety and financial concerns cited for the suspension. Later that same day, the team announced that it was ceasing operations immediately and would issue refunds to ticket holders. The Salina Journal reported that a lack of workers' compensation insurance for the players led the coach to suspend practices and the CIF to suspend the franchise.

Off-field moves
After the 2014 season ended, the Champions Professional Indoor Football League announced it was merging with teams from other leagues to form a new league, Champions Indoor Football. The Bombers are one of four CPIFL teams to join the CIF, alongside the Dodge City Law, Omaha Beef, and Sioux City Bandits.

Awards and honors
Each week of the regular season, the CIF named league-wide Players of the Week in offensive, defensive, and special teams categories. For Week 1, the CIF named defensive back Isiah Barfield as the Defensive Player of the Week. For Week 3, the CIF named quarterback Chris Coffin as the Offensive Player of the Week and kick returner OJ Simpson as the Special Teams Player of the Week. For Week 4, the CIF named kicker Thomas Frevert as the Special Teams Player of the Week. For Week 6, the CIF named defensive linesman Clarence Bumpass as the Defensive Player of the Week. For Week 10, the CIF again named quarterback Chris Coffin as the Offensive Player of the Week. For Week 11, the CIF once again named quarterback Chris Coffin as the Offensive Player of the Week and defensive back Isiah Barfield as the Defensive Player of the Week.

On June 6, Bombers quarterback Chris Coffin was honored as the CIF's Offensive Player of the Year.

Schedule
Key:

Pre-season

Regular season

 Duke City alternate home site as Tingley Coliseum was unavailable in June
 Game cancelled after Salina Bombers ejected from league on May 28, 2015.

Roster

Standings

Playoffs

References

External links
Salina Bombers official website
Salina Bombers at Our Sports Central

Salina Bombers seasons
Salina Bombers
Salina Bombers